John Charlesworth (1782–1864) was an English abolitionist and Anglican clergyman. He was a friend of Thomas Clarkson, and for many years lived in Flowton, Suffolk, not far from him.

John was the son of John Charlesworth (1752–1821), Rector of Ossington, Nottinghamshire. His brother was Edward Parker Charlesworth, a prominent physician and early psychiatrist.

Selected works 
 1833 Providential Deliverance; a narrative of facts. By a Clergyman. Ipswich: S. H. Cowell
 1842 On affliction and spiritual distress. London: Hamilton, Adams & Co.

References 

1782 births
1864 deaths
19th-century English Anglican priests
English abolitionists
Christian abolitionists